Matilda was the mascot of the 1982 Commonwealth Games held in Brisbane, Queensland, Australia.

Matilda was a model of a kangaroo built on top of a forklift. Standing over 13 metres tall and weighing six tonnes, it could turn its head, its ears could wriggle, and eyes could wink and blink. Its pouch doubled as a door, which opened during the opening ceremony to let out 20 children, dressed as joeys, who ran out two by two for a trampoline display.

After the games, it ended up at the entrance to Cade's County Waterpark on the Gold Coast. In 2009 it was sold to Puma Energy who applied to re-erect it at the Matilda petrol station on the Gold Coast Highway in Tugun, however after the Gold Coast City Council deemed it breached its planning regulations, it was relocated to the Matilda fuel station on the Bruce Highway at Kybong.

See also

List of Australian sporting mascots
List of Commonwealth Games mascots
Borobi (mascot)
Clyde (mascot)
Karak (mascot)
Shera (mascot)

References

Animal mascots
Australian mascots
Commonwealth Games mascots
1982 Commonwealth Games
Mascots introduced in 1982
Queensland in fiction
Fictional kangaroos and wallabies